"Sing Hallelujah!" is a song recorded by Sweden-based musician and producer Dr. Alban. It was released in 1993 as the third single from his second studio album, One Love (1992). Been described as an "discothèques anthem with dance and disco sonorities", the song became a hit in many European countries, managing to reach to the top 5 in Belgium, Denmark, Finland, Germany, Iceland and Switzerland. In the UK, it peaked at number 16 on the UK Singles Chart, while on the Eurochart Hot 100, it peaked at number four. Outside Europe, in Australia, "Sing Hallelujah!" peaked at number five and in Zimbabwe, it reached number 11. After "It's My Life", this was the second Dr Alban's hit which had an international scope. Its accompanying music video also received heavy rotation on MTV Europe. In 2005, "Sing Hallelujah!" charted again when it was re-recorded by the artist in new versions, peaking at number 12 in Finland.

Critical reception
Larry Flick from Billboard noted that the song already had enjoyed a very hot run through much of England and Europe. He added, "The record's peppy pop/NRG personality is enhanced by rousing handclaps, insistent piano lines, and a chirpy gospel choir. Truly irresistible tune will have you raising your hands to the sky and singing along with the wonderfully catchy chorus." In his weekly UK chart commentary, James Masterton said, "The latest single is by no means as catchy as the last, has the disadvantage of not being embedded in the psyche of drunken Brits on the Costa Del Sol during the summer and is generally not very good anyway so further chart progress is unlikely." Pan-European magazine Music & Media commented, "Pulling teeth is  not so painful after all, because down at the doctor's a gospel choir breaks loose on a dance beat." Wendi Cermak from The Network Forty remarked that the song is "creating a buzz in the clubs".

Chart performance
"Sing Hallelujah!" made an impact on the charts on several continents, becoming a major hit in many countries. In Europe, it was a top 5 hit in Flemish Belgium (3), Denmark (3), Finland (2), Germany (4), Iceland (5), Switzerland (4), as well as on the Eurochart Hot 100, where the song peaked at number four. In addition, it was a top 10 hit in Austria (7), France (7), Greece (10), Ireland (6), the Netherlands (6), Norway (8), Portugal (7) and Sweden (6). In the United Kingdom, "Sing Hallelujah!" only reached the top 20, peaking at number 16 on the UK Singles Chart on April 25, 1993, after 4 weeks on the chart. Outside Europe, it went to number five in Australia and on the Canadian RPM Dance/Urban chart, number 11 in Zimbabwe and number 15 on the US Billboard Hot Dance Club Play chart. 

The single was awarded with a gold record in Denmark, a silver record in France, with a sale of 25,000 units, and a platinum record in Australia and Germany, after 70,000 and 500,000 singles were sold.

Impact and legacy
English DJ, producer and broadcaster Dave Pearce included "Sing Hallelujah!" in his all-time top 10 in 1997, saying, "A really anthemic vibe. I play this on special occasions and when it breaks down into the chorus it always gets a top reaction. It's guaranteed to put a smile on the face and to send knickers and handbags flying thru the air!"

Track listings

12" single
"Sing Hallelujah!" (Long Version) – 6:30
"Sing Hallelujah!" (Paradise Dub) – 4:59
"Sing Hallelujah!" (Original Version) – 4:24

CD single
"Sing Hallelujah!" (Short) – 4:00
"Sing Hallelujah!" (Long) – 6:30

CD maxi
"Sing Hallelujah!" (Short) – 4:00
"Sing Hallelujah!" (Long) – 6:30
"Sing Hallelujah!" (Paradise Dub) – 4:59
"Sing Hallelujah!" (Original version) – 4:24

7" maxi – Remixes
"Sing Hallelujah!" (Easter Mix N.C.)
"Sing Hallelujah!" (Easter edit N.C.)
"Sing Hallelujah!" (DJ's Eurotrans remix)

CD maxi - Remixes
"Sing Hallelujah!" (Easter Edit) – 3:58
"Sing Hallelujah!" (Easter Mix) – 7:29
"Sing Hallelujah!" (JJ's Eurotrans Mix) – 6:14

Official versions
"Sing Hallelujah!" (Original version) – 4:24
"Sing Hallelujah!" (Original Edit) (Single Edit) – 3:51
"Sing Hallelujah!" (Short) – 4:00
"Sing Hallelujah!" (Long) – 6:30
"Sing Hallelujah!" (Bitcrusher Club Mix)
"Sing Hallelujah!" (DJ's Eurotrans Remix)
"Sing Hallelujah!" (Dj Stevie Steve's Pizzi Edit)
"Sing Hallelujah!" (Easter Mix N.C.)
"Sing Hallelujah!" (Easter Edit N.C.)
"Sing Hallelujah!" (Paradise Dub) – 4:59

Charts and sales

Weekly charts

1 "Sing Hallelujah!" by Yamboo featuring Dr. Alban

Year-end charts

Certifications and sales

Mozaic version
In 1995, Paul Oakenfold's Perfecto Records released a dance track based on an interpolation of "Sing Hallelujah!" called "Sing It (The Hallelujah Song)". Credited to an act called Mozaic, the song became a hit in the UK, debuting at its peak position of No. 14 in August 1995. In 2015, Oakenfold would include the "Quivvers Dirty Dub" mix of the song on his compilation album 25 Years of Perfecto Records.

References

1992 songs
1993 singles
2005 singles
Dr. Alban songs
English-language Swedish songs
Song recordings produced by Denniz Pop
Songs written by Denniz Pop
Songs written by Dr. Alban